The Höör Sandstone is a geologic formation in Skåne County, southern Sweden. It is Early Jurassic (Hettangian-Pliensbachian) in age. This unit outcrops in central Skane on a few isolated exposures, being traditionally subdivided into the lower “millstone” (“kvarnstenen”) and the upper “buildingstone”. The lowermost layers where also claimed to host Rhaetian strata, however latter works suggested that the layers devolved as red beds, were part of the new Hörby Formation, thus delimitating the Höör sandstone to the lower Jurassic. It has been assumed to be limited to Hettangian-Sinemurian layers, yet recent palynological analisis suggest the uppermost section is of Pliensbachian age, underliying and maybe interacting with the younger volcanic deposits. The Höör sandstone represents a mostly fluvial unit with a rich collection of flossil plants, yet also includes brackish bivalves in some layers, pointing to marine ingressions locally.

Members

Stanstorp member
This member represents the older layers of the formation, being exposed in the abandoned stanstorpsgraven quarry and in the Vittseröd area. The member is mainly composed by sandstone and has abundant plants fossils, with both Both allochthonous plant frag ments and plant roots indicating vegetation in situ (palaeosols). The layers suggest several type of fluvial and/or coastal depositions, from dunes and river banks to beach deposits, where the palaeocurrent directions are clear generally from the north-east to the south-west. This section hosts abundant conglomerate intercalations, with the lower ones formed by mud fragments and the uppers with distant source material, both abundant on wood fragments, some of them up to 20 cm in diameter).

Vittseröd member
The youngest member is composed by finer-grained and much better sorted sandstones, with limited abundance of mudstones and plant fragments small and limited to a few horizons. The presence of silt and mature quartz arenites, well sorted and fairly well rounded derived from strongly altered feldspars, shows that this member hosted  a high-energy environment, one where tidal currents have been invoked for the modification of fine-grained sandstones, linked with the changes of the Laurasian Seaway. The upper parts of this unit are influenced by the initial pulse of the Pliensbachian coeval vulcanism with heavy volcanic minerals in the uppermost layers.

Fauna

Ichnofossils 

Lockeia siliquaria (Bivalves) 
Planolites annularis (Polychaetes) 
Planolites montanus (Polychaetes)
Diplichnites isp. (Xiphosurans, Insects, Arachnids)
Teichichnus isp. (Polychaetes, Echiurans, Holothurians.)
Skolithos isp. (Polychaetes, Phoronidans)
Monocraterion tentaculatum  (Polychaeta, Sipuncula, Enteropneustans & Echiurans)
Rhizocorallium isp. (Polychaeta, Sipuncula, Enteropneustans & Echiurans)
Aulichnites isp. (Gastropods)
Diplocraterion parallelum (Polychaeta, Sipuncula, Enteropneustans & Echiurans)

Bivalves

Arthropoda

Flora

References 

Geologic formations of Sweden
Jurassic System of Europe
Early Jurassic Europe
Jurassic Sweden
Hettangian Stage
Sinemurian Stage
Pliensbachian Stage
Sandstone formations
Coal formations
Coal in Sweden
Paleontology in Sweden